"If I Had You" is a 1928 song by "Irving King" (Jimmy Campbell and Reg Connelly) with Ted Shapiro. Early hit versions in 1929 were by Rudy Vallée and Al Bowlly.

Many other artists have recorded the song over the years.

References

See also
List of 1920s jazz standards

1920s jazz standards
1928 songs
Songs written by Jimmy Campbell and Reg Connelly
Songs written by Ted Shapiro
Jazz compositions in B-flat major
Al Bowlly songs